Lillian Knight (née Unold) (March 23, 1883 – May 16, 1946) was an American western star and silent film actress. An obituary called her "the First Film Queen of the West."

Early life and background
She was born Lillian E. Unold in Milwaukee, Wisconsin. When she was sixteen, she volunteered to ride a bronco side saddle when Tiger Bill's Wild West show was at Pabst Park. She won a cash prize and a contract with William Dickey, the show's owner. She was billed as the world's greatest woman rider. She performed in the 101 Ranch, Tiger Bill, Pawnee Bill, and Buffalo Bill shows. She toured the country and rode wild horses; she became a "crack shot" and performed with Annie Oakley.

Film career

Knight came to California in 1906. She lived in Pasadena until five years before her death. 

She performed in films under the name Lillian Knight. Two of her early films were Custer's Last Fight and The Deserter. Later she worked in Tom Mix films. She was in an accident in 1913 that stalled her career. She did not walk unassisted for four years following the accident.

Personal life and death
Knight was once engaged to Ken Maynard. At the time of her death on May 16, 1946, in Pomona, California, she was known as Mrs. Lillian E. Dorris. She died at Pomona Valley Community Hospital. She was survived by her husband, William Dorris.

Selected filmography 

 Custer's Last Fight (1912)
 The Deserter (1912)
The Silent Way (1914)
 The Resolve (1915)
 High Cost of Flirting (1915)
 The Jilt (1915)
 Margy of the Foothills (1916) 
 The Silken Spider (1916)

References

External links 

Actresses from Milwaukee
American silent film actresses
20th-century American actresses
1883 births
1946 deaths